Roger Menetrey (born 16 June 1945) is a retired French professional welterweight boxer. On 4 June 1971 he won the European Boxing Union (EBU) title and defended it five times. On 23 June 1973 he unsuccessfully contested the WBC title against José Nápoles. Menetrey retired after losing his EBU title to John H. Stracey on 27 May 1974. During his career he won 52 out of 59 bouts, 42 of them by knockout.

References

1945 births
Living people
French male boxers
Welterweight boxers
People from Annemasse
Sportspeople from Haute-Savoie